Megacraspedus cerussatellus is a moth of the family Gelechiidae. It was described by Rebel in 1930. It is found in the border area between Bulgaria and Greece.

The forewings are white, sprinkled with brownish-grey and with black markings. The hindwings are light grey.

References

Moths described in 1930
Megacraspedus